Athanasius of Brest-Litovsk (died September 5, 1648) is a saint and hieromartyr of the Russian Orthodox Church and the Polish Orthodox Church. He was killed by Catholics for opposition to the Union of Brest. Athanasius is commemorated on September 5.

Athanasius Filipovich was born to a petty Lithuanian nobleman in Brest-Litovsk, then part of the Polish–Lithuanian Commonwealth. As a well-educated man in modern and ancient languages, the writings of the Church Fathers, and the works of Western philosophers and theologians, Athanasius worked for several years as a private tutor. In 1627 he entered the Monastery of the Holy Spirit in Vilnius. He later moved to other monasteries and was ordained a priest. In 1637, he transferred to the Monastery of Kupyatitsk near Minsk. He was sent to collect donations for the restoration of the church. The journey was accompanied by visions, miraculous signs, and physical dangers.

In 1640, Athanasius became hegumen of the Monastery of St Simeon Stylites in Brest-Litovsk. From then on, he advocated against Roman proselytism and the Union of Brest. In 1643, he spoke before the Polish sejm (parliament) in favor of Orthodoxy and against the Union. He was proclaimed insane, arrested, and stripped of his monastic titles. Athanasius was then sent to Peter Mogila, Metropolitan of Kiev, who sent him back to Brest-Litovsk. That did not stop his protests and Athanasius was arrested again in 1644, but was released a year later. The Khmelnytsky Uprising among the Ukrainian Cossacks started in 1648. Athanasius was accused of ties with the rebels. He was arrested, tortured, and executed. His remains were found on July 20, 1649 – the day is sometimes commemorated as an alternative feast day.

References

References

Year of birth unknown
1648 deaths
People from Brest, Belarus
People from Brest Litovsk Voivodeship
Lithuanian saints
Eastern Orthodox saints from Belarus
Russian saints of the Eastern Orthodox Church
17th-century Eastern Orthodox martyrs
17th-century Christian saints
17th-century Eastern Orthodox priests
17th-century Belarusian people